Preignan (Prenhan in Gascon) is a commune in the Gers department in southwestern France.

The commune is situated on the N21 and bordered on the west by the river Gers.

Geography

History
The origin of the name is uncertain. It may be anthroponymic, derived from either the Latin name Prineus, Premius or Priscus. The village evolved near the site of a Gallo-Roman villa in the area of La Pastissé, which existed from the 1st or 3rd century to the 5th century CE. The villa's farmlands extended south towards the stream of En Tourette covering about two hectares. During the Merovignian period, the site began to be used as a cemetery and the Romanesque Church of Saint-Étienne was built using material from the villa. A mosaic from the villa discovered at the turn of the 20th century was placed in the church.

A fortified town emerged in the High Middle Ages on the hills facing the Gers River under the auspices of a lord of Preignan. Documents attest to a family of lords existing from the 13th to 15th century, which intermarried with the lords of Montégut and Roquelaure. Vestiges of the family's fort (today, private property) remain. The Church of Saint-Étienne was remodeled in the 16th century and has a 17th-century gilded-wood retable, which was recently restored. The village is also the site of the Chartreuse du Pastissé (also private property), where Jean-Joseph Dessolles, (1767-1828) lived.

On the northern part of the commune is the hamlet of Gaudoux, a former fief and later separate commune, which was joined to Preignan in 1821. Gerald VI, the Count of Armagnac, granted the hamlet a charter (charte de coutumes) in 1276.

Population

International relations
Preignan is twinned with:
  Corral de Calatrava, Spain

See also
Communes of the Gers department

References

External links

 Official site (In French)
 Preignan, Community of Communes of Greater Auch (In French)

Communes of Gers